The Good Plumber is a 2016 Czech comedy film written and directed by Tomáš Vorel.

Plot
Plumber Luboš repairs everything but finds it difficult to cope with everyday life without the help of his mother.

Cast and characters
 Jakub Kohák as Luboš Cafourek
 Eva Holubová as Luboš's mother
 Petra Špalková as Sýkorová
 Filip Blažek as Sýkora
 Jan Budař as Radek

References

External links
 

2016 comedy films
Czech comedy films